Conrad Dibia Nwawo (1922 – 2016) was a military officer. He took part actively in the Nigeria-Biafra Civil War, initially fighting on the Nigerian side and then switching to the Biafran side.

Early life
Born in 1922, Nwawo hails from Akwubili, Ogbeobi in Onicha Olona, in Aniocha North LGA of present-day Delta state. He schooled at Aggrey Memorial School in Arochukwu, under the tutelage of Dr. Alvan Ikoku, and also attended the Ilesha Grammar School.

Career
During his time fighting on the Biafran side during the Nigerian-Biafran Civil War, he headed commands such as the 11 Div, the 13 Div, and the Biafra Commando Forces.

This is incorrect as Mid-Western Region was already created before the Civil War. When the twelve (12) State structur was enacted in 1967, Mid-Western Region was named Mid-Western State. Denis Osadebey was the Premier of Mid-Western Region till the coup of January 1966.

Post-Civil war

After the Civil War, Nwawo contacted his colleagues to join him in seeking for the creation of Mid-Western Region from the erstwhile Western Region, amongst which were Dr. George Orewa, Mr. F. C. Halim, Chief Israel Amadi Emina and Chief Izah.

References 

1922 births
Nigerian military officers
2016 deaths
People from Delta State